Christopher Bennett Linnin (born May 4, 1957) is a former American football defensive tackle in the National Football League (NFL) who played for the New York Giants. He played college football at University of Washington.

References 

1957 births
Living people
American football defensive tackles
Washington Huskies football players
New York Giants players